Bakhshal Thalho (Urdu: بخشل تھلہو, born May 1, 1974) is a Pakistani, left-wing political worker, organizer and progressive writer. He is president of Awami Workers Party, Sindh.

Early life and education
Thalho was born in Naseerabad, Sindh, which was part of district Larkana that time. Thalho lives in Hyderabad, Sindh. He got his early education from primary School and High School of Naseerabad, got the Higher Secondary Education (F.Sc.) from Government Degree College, Naseerabad in 1992. Thalho got degree of Doctor Of Veterinary Medicine (DVM) in 1999 from Sindh Agriculture University, Tindojam.

Career 
Thalho started his career as veterinary doctor and served as President of Pakistan Veterinary Medical Association (PVMA) for 3 years till 2012. During this period, in order to restore seats for public service commission, he sat on 84 hours hunger strike and succeeded in restoration of 180 seats.

Political struggle
Thalho joined politics as a student when he joined Jiye Sindh Student Federation from 1995 to 1997. Later he became part of Jiye Sindh Inqalabi Party in 1998.

Progressive Veterinarian Forum

Thalho was part of the Progressive Veterinarian Forum, Sindh. While serving as president of Pakistan Veterinary Medical Association (PVMA), he took part in protest to demand more job opportunities for veterinary doctors.

Labour Party

Thalho joined Labour Party Pakistan in 2008 and elected as general secretary in 2009. From 2009 to 2012 he stayed part of Labour Party.

An FIR was registered against Thalho in 2012 when as member of Sindhi Progressive Tehreek he was taking part in protests against forced conversions.

Sindh Progressive Committee

Thalho is also acting as convener of Sindh Progressive Committee. At the start of COVID-19 pandemic, he demanded establishment of free coronavirus screening centres in all divisions and free ration distribution.

Awami Workers Party

Thalho is socialist organizer, a senior and leading member of the Awami Workers Party (AWP) and is serving as President AWP Sindh. AWP has its branches in ten districts of Sindh. When AWP was formed in 2012, he was elected as general secretary of AWP Sindh. In 2014, he was again elected as general secretary of AWP Sindh. In 2016, he was elected as President AWP Sindh in AWP congress and since then he is serving as AWP Sindh's president.
  
As AWP leader, Thalho kept raising his voice on various human rights issues including peasants' rights, women’s rights, political prisoners, enforced disappearances, land grab, students' rights and inflation etc.

Thalho is a member of an interim joint action committee which was formed in 2020 to safeguard interests of Sindh’s islands, health, education, and basic human rights.

Thalho has elected as general secretary AWP in its third central congress held in Lahore on 12-13 March, 2022.

Publications
Thalho got inspiration from Asim Ali Akhund (1975–2008) (Labour Party member) and considered him his mentor who helped to start the magazine Adarsh in 2003, later it was named as Smajwad which is a Sindhi Urdu Bilingual magazine. He has written two books in Sindhi "Thakyai Thar Thelh" (2015) and "Tabdilia Jo Falsafo" (2017).

References

Living people
Pakistani human rights activists
Pakistani humanists
Awami Workers Party politicians
1974 births